The Cedartown Waterworks–Woman's Building–Big Spring Park Historic District is a historic district listed on the National Register of Historic Places.  It includes three properties in Polk County, Georgia, west of downtown Cedartown, Georgia: Big Spring Park, the Cedartown Waterworks, and the Cedartown Woman's Building.

The district was listed on the National Register of Historic Places in 2000.

See also
National Register of Historic Places listings in Polk County, Georgia

References

Buildings and structures in Polk County, Georgia
Women's club buildings in Georgia (U.S. state)
Historic districts on the National Register of Historic Places in Georgia (U.S. state)
History of women in Georgia (U.S. state)